Clathria lissoclada, the triangular blade sponge, is a species of demosponge from the southern hemisphere.

Description 
The somewhat flat branches arise from semi-triangular blades. The surface is smooth with many randomly distributed oscules. This sponge is semi-compressible and tough.

Distribution and habitat 
This species is found off the coast of South Africa and off the Falklands.

Ecology 
This species often has polyp-like invertebrates living on its surface.

References 

Demospongiae
Biodiversity of South Africa
Species described in 1934